James Joseph Brady (February 29, 1944 – December 9, 2017) was an American lawyer who served as a United States district judge of the United States District Court for the Middle District of Louisiana, based in the capital city of Baton Rouge.

Education and career

Born in St. Louis, Missouri, Brady received a Bachelor of Arts degree from Southeastern Louisiana University in 1966 and a Juris Doctor from Louisiana State University Law School in 1969. He was in private practice in Louisiana from 1969 to 2000. He was a member of the Louisiana Board of Tax Appeals from 1975 to 1980, and was an adjunct professor at Louisiana State University in 1985, 1987 and 1990.

Federal judicial service

On July 14, 1999, Brady was nominated by President Bill Clinton to a seat on the United States District Court for the Middle District of Louisiana vacated by John Victor Parker. Brady was confirmed by the United States Senate on May 24, 2000, and received his commission on May 25, 2000. Brady assumed senior status on December 31, 2013, serving in that status until his death on December 9, 2017. Brady was still active at the time of his death and had been scheduled to preside over a case of an individual charged with attempting to steal President Donald Trump's tax returns, with jury selection scheduled to begin just two days after his death. He died in Baton Rouge at the age of seventy-three.

References

Sources

1944 births
2017 deaths
Lawyers from St. Louis
Southeastern Louisiana University alumni
Louisiana State University Law Center alumni
Louisiana State University faculty
Judges of the United States District Court for the Middle District of Louisiana
United States district court judges appointed by Bill Clinton
Louisiana Democrats
20th-century American judges
21st-century American judges
Fellows of the American Physical Society